PATR-II is a linguistic formalism used in computational linguistics, developed by Stuart M. Shieber. It uses context-free grammar rules and feature constraints on these rules.

See also 
 Head-driven phrase structure grammar

External links
 PC-PATR, an implementation of PATR-II for PC and Unix systems.

Computational linguistics